Owen Roe most commonly refers to Owen Roe O'Neill (–1649), an Irish nobleman and military leader, or to institutions named for him:
Owen Roe O'Neill's GAC (County Tyrone)
CLG Eoghan Rua (County Londonderry)
Eoghan Ruadh, Dungannon GAA
"The Lament for Owen Roe", ballad

It may also refer to:
Eoghan Rua Ó Súilleabháin, poet
Eoghan Ruadh Mac an Bhaird, poet
Owen Roe McGovern, Gaelic footballer
Owen Roe (actor)